Bishopston and Ashley Down is one of the thirty-four council wards in the city of Bristol in the Southwest of England, United Kingdom.

Bishopston and Ashley Down

The ward covers all of Ashley Down as well as parts of Bishopston and Horfield.

Bishopston and Ashley Down has a greater than average amount of young people living in the ward. Over 18% of the population is aged 16–24, compared to the Bristol average of 16%. Furthermore, nearly 30% of the population is aged 25–39, higher than the Bristol average of 27%.

Notable places in Bishopston and Ashley Down ward include Gloucester Road, Bristol County Ground, HMP Bristol, City of Bristol College (Ashley Down Centre) and Memorial Stadium.

Politics

Bishopston and Ashley Down ward was created in May 2016 following a boundary review. It incorporates much of the areas formerly part of the Bishopston ward. It is represented by two councillors on Bristol City Council. Currently, these are Lily Fitzgibbon and Emma Edwards, both members of the Green Party.

Bishopston and Ashley Down is part of the parliamentary constituency of Bristol West. Since 2015 the Member of Parliament is Thangam Debbonaire, a Labour Party member.

2021 election

2016 election

References 

Wards of Bristol